Pitaya Tibnoke (born 21 September 1989 in Surin, Thailand) is a weightlifter competing in the 85 kg category. He placed 12th at the 2012 Summer Olympics.

Award
 2012 - Summer Olympics - 12th place
 2014 - Asian Games - 6th place
 2011 - Thailand National Games - 2x  Golden Medal
 2011 - Thailand National Games -  Silver Medal

References 

Pitaya Tibnoke
1989 births
Living people
Weightlifters at the 2012 Summer Olympics
Pitaya Tibnoke
Weightlifters at the 2010 Asian Games
Weightlifters at the 2014 Asian Games
Pitaya Tibnoke
Southeast Asian Games medalists in weightlifting

Pitaya Tibnoke
Competitors at the 2007 Southeast Asian Games
Competitors at the 2009 Southeast Asian Games
Competitors at the 2011 Southeast Asian Games
Competitors at the 2013 Southeast Asian Games
Pitaya Tibnoke
Pitaya Tibnoke